Holor (also Romanized as Halor; also known as Dehlar and Holū) is a village in Howmeh Rural District, in the Central District of Qeshm County, Hormozgan Province, Iran. At the 2006 census, its population was 5,043, in 1,088 families.

References 

Populated places in Qeshm County